Ongryu Bridge, also spelled Okryu Bridge and Ongnyu Bridge, is a bridge on the Taedong River in and near Pyongyang, North Korea. Construction began in March 1958; the bridge was opened in August 1960. 

Located between the old Taedong Bridge before it and the Rungra Bridge above it, it is the fourth (heading upstream) of six Pyongyang bridges on the Taedong. It connects Chung-guyok on the Taedong's right (west) bank to Taedonggang-guyok on the left bank. The famous restaurant Okryu-gwan is near its right foot, while the Juche Tower is located just south of its left foot.

Construction

References

Bridges in North Korea
Buildings and structures in Pyongyang
Bridges completed in 1960
1960 establishments in North Korea
20th-century architecture in North Korea